Miners Rest is a suburb north of Ballarat, Victoria, Australia on the north-western rural-urban fringe of the city,  northwest of the Central Business District.

Miners Rest is a semi-rural town with a very small township and commercial area. It is located to the north of the Western Freeway.

History
The original Township of Miners Rest, surveyed in 1854, is located at the northern end of the district.

Education 
The local primary school is Miners Rest Primary School.
The local secondary school catchment is Mount Rowan Secondary College.

References

Suburbs of Ballarat
1862 establishments in Australia